Yuraq Kancha (Quechua yuraq white, kancha corral, enclosure, frame,  also spelled Yurajcancha) is a mountain in the Wansu mountain range in the Andes of Peru, about  high. It is situated in the Cusco Region, Chumbivilcas Province, Santo Tomás District. Yuraq Kancha lies north of Minasniyuq and Qullpa K'uchu. The river Qañawimayu originates near the mountain.

References 

Mountains of Peru
Mountains of Cusco Region